Hottentotta finneganae is a species of scorpion, belonging to the family Buthidae. It was first found in Pakistan.

References

Further reading
Lowe, Graeme. "Two new species of Hottentotta Birula, 1908 (Scorpiones: Buthidae) from Northern Oman." Euscorpius 2010.103 (2015): 1-23.
Navidpour, Shahrokh, and Graeme Lowe. "Revised diagnosis and redescription of Apistobuthus susanae (Scorpiones, Buthidae)." Journal of Arachnology 37.1 (2009): 45-59.

Buthidae
Animals described in 2007
Scorpions of Asia